Bishop Montgomery High School (commonly referred to as "BMHS" or simply "Bishop" by students) is a Catholic high school serving twenty-five parishes in the Roman Catholic Archdiocese of Los Angeles. BMHS was founded in 1957, and staffed by the Sisters of St. Joseph of Carondelet, Conventual Franciscans, and lay faculty. The  campus is located in Torrance, California, in southwest Los Angeles County, one mile (1.6 km) from the Pacific Ocean and the Del Amo Mall. The coeducational student body is approximately 900 students in grades 9 through 12, making BMHS the sixth largest private high school in Los Angeles County. The faculty is headed by Principal Dr. Jim Garza.

The school is named for the first American-born Bishop of Monterey-Los Angeles, the Most Reverend George Thomas Montgomery. As the ordinary of the diocese from 1896 to 1902, Bishop Montgomery demanded that government recognize the right of parents to send their children to schools of their choice.

BMHS is accredited by the Western Association of Schools and Colleges (WASC) and offers a comprehensive college preparatory curriculum combined with Christian values. Advanced Placement courses are offered in all major subjects, and 98 percent of graduates pursue higher education.

Athletics
Bishop Montgomery competes in most high school sports, playing in the California Interscholastic Federation (CIF) Del Rey League against Bishop Amat (La Puente), St. Bernard (Playa del Rey), St. Paul (Santa Fe Springs), and Junipero Serra (Gardena). Other local rivals include Torrance High School, St. John Bosco (Bellflower), and St. Joseph (Lakewood). BMHS has been particularly successful in its basketball and volleyball programs, frequently appearing in the California state quarterfinals or higher. The school's teams go by the name "The Knights", and the team colors are black and gold.

The following sports are offered at Bishop Montgomery:
Football
Volleyball
Softball
Soccer
Cross country
Track and Field
Golf
Tennis
Basketball
Baseball
Swimming
Song Team
Pep flags / Short Flags
Surf
eSports

Music Department

The BMHS Music Department includes academic classes, campus music ministry, and performing ensembles.  Academic classes are offered during the day, and include Music Theory, Music History, and Music Production.  Campus music ministry meets after school, and prepares music for school masses.  Performing ensembles include: Knight Band and Guard, the school marching band; Wind Ensemble; Jazz Band; Jazz Combo; Vocal Jazz; Indoor Drumline; and Winter Color Guard. Most recently, the department has hosted a spring SCSBOA (Southern California School Band and Orchestra Association) Solo / Ensemble Festival, and traveled with 80 participants to Washington, D.C., to perform at the World War II Memorial.

Notable alumni

Nnamdi Asomugha, NFL cornerback for the Oakland Raiders (freshman year only)
Denise Austin, fitness pioneer (Class of 1975)
Bill Bordley, former Major League Baseball pitcher (Class of 1976)
Marine Cano, former professional soccer player (Class of 1972)
Errick Craven, professional basketball player in the French Ligue Nationale de Basketball (Class of 2001)
Chris Engen, television actor (Class of 1997)
Dreux Frederic (Lil' Fizz), rapper from B2K (attended freshman year, 1999–2000)
Carmelita Jeter, gold-medalist sprinter (Class of 1998)
Richard T. Jones, actor
Brandon Lee, actor (freshman year only)
Michael Mendoza, American football player
Patricia Neske, former German figure skater (Class of 1984)
Terrance Pennington, free-agent offensive tackle in the NFL, formerly with the Buffalo Bills (Class of 2001)
Noelle Quinn, UCLA women's basketball player (Class of 2003), formerly in the WNBA with the Los Angeles Sparks and Seattle Storm, current head coach with the Seattle Storm
Sigi Schmid, head coach, MLS Seattle Sounders (Class of 1971) and US Soccer hall of fame member.
Omarr Smith, current Arena Football League defensive back with the San Jose SaberCats (Class of 1995)
Ethan Thompson, Basketball player for the Oregon State Beavers (Class of 2017)
 Stephen Thompson Jr. (born 1997), basketball player in the Israeli Basketball Premier League
Stanley Wilson, NFL cornerback with the Detroit Lions (Class of 2000)

Notes and references

External links
 Bishop Montgomery High School web site

Roman Catholic secondary schools in Los Angeles County, California
Educational institutions established in 1957
Congregation of the Sisters of Saint Joseph
1957 establishments in California
Catholic secondary schools in California
Education in Torrance, California
Buildings and structures in Torrance, California